Vepa Hajiyev is a Turkmenistan politician who is currently serving as Deputy Minister of Foreign Affairs.

References

Living people
Government ministers of Turkmenistan
Foreign ministers of Turkmenistan
Year of birth missing (living people)